St. Nicholas is a small village in the Vale of Glamorgan, South Wales. It lies 2 miles west of the capital city, Cardiff and 7 miles from its city centre. St. Nicholas is the highest elevation village in the Vale of Glamorgan. The population was 417 in 2011. It is in the community of St Nicholas and Bonvilston.

Amenities & History 
The A48 road divides the village in half, with a parish church and primary school north of it and housing south of it. However there are no shops or pubs in the village, the nearest being in Bonvilston or Culverhouse Cross. The A4226 (Five Mile Lane) connects it to nearby Barry from the A48.

The village lacks a pub and in 2017 the Church Hall was sold.

On October 6, 2016, a controversial planning application by Redrow Homes was granted, adding 100 dwellings to the village.  A further 17 were added by Waterstone Homes.  Building began in the summer of 2017, and on completion doubled the size of the village.

It is served by public transport by the First Cymru X2 service westbound to Bonvilston, Cowbridge, Bridgend and Porthcawl, and eastbound to Culverhouse Cross, Ely, Canton and Cardiff Central bus station.

Gallery

References

External links and Extra Information 
Further information:

St. Nicholas Village Website
 St Nicholas Church in Wales Primary School
Photos of St. Nicholas and surrounding area on geograph.org.uk

Villages in the Vale of Glamorgan